Babia may refer to:
Babia (beetle), a genus of leaf beetles
Babia, Poland, a village in west-central Poland
Babia, Spain, a Spanish comarca in province of León
Babia, Congo, a village in Democratic Republic of the Congo
Babia 93, a 1993 album by Sajjad Ali
"Babia" (song), a track from that album
Babia Góra or Babia hora, a mountain on the Polish–Slovak border
Babia Góra National Park
Babia Góra, Podlaskie Voivodeship, a village in north-east Poland